The men's 100 metres event was one of the events in the 1980 Summer Olympics in Moscow. The competition was held on July 24, 1980, and on July 25, 1980. Sixty-five athletes from 40 nations competed. Each nation was limited to 3 athletes per rules in force since the 1930 Olympic Congress. The event was won by Allan Wells of Great Britain, that nation's first title in the men's 100 metres since 1924. Cuba took its first medal in the event since 1964, with Silvio Leonard's silver matching the nation's best result. Petar Petrov's bronze was Bulgaria's first Olympic medal in the men's 100 metres.

Background

This was the nineteenth time the event was held, having appeared at every Olympics since the first in 1896. Four finalists from 1980 returned: defending gold medal winner Hasely Crawford of Trinidad and Tobago, silver medalist Don Quarrie of Jamaica, seventh-place finisher Klaus-Dieter Kurrat of East Germany, and eighth-place finisher Petar Petrov of Bulgaria, while the American team, including 1977 IAAF World Cup winner Steve Williams, were absent as they boycotted the Games. Other notable entrants included Silvio Leonard of Cuba (1975 and 1979 Pan-American Games champion, 1976 Olympic quarterfinalist, 1977 World Cup bronze medal), Eugen Ray of East Germany (1977 World Cup silver medalist), and Allan Wells of Great Britain (second to Quarrie at the 1978 Commonwealth Games).

Eleven nations appeared in the event for the first time: Angola, Benin, Botswana, Guinea, Laos, Lebanon, Mozambique, Nepal, Seychelles, Sierra Leone, and Syria, while the United States missed this event for the first (and so far only) time in Olympic history. France and Great Britain made their 16th appearances in the event, tied with Canada (also absent due to the boycott) for second-most, after the United States, with 18.

Competition format

The event retained the same basic four round format introduced in 1920: heats, quarterfinals, semifinals, and a final. The "fastest loser" system, introduced in 1968, was used again to ensure that the quarterfinals and subsequent rounds had exactly 8 runners per heat; this time, that system applied only in the preliminary heats. With only 2 more runners than in 1976, the format was held very static—including the number of heats.

The first round consisted of 9 heats, each with 6–8 athletes. The top three runners in each heat advanced, along with the next five fastest runners overall. This made 32 quarterfinalists, who were divided into 4 heats of 8 runners. The top four runners in each quarterfinal advanced, with no "fastest loser" places. The 16 semifinalists competed in two heats of 8, with the top four in each semifinal advancing to the eight-man final.

Records

These are the standing world and Olympic records (in seconds) prior to the 1980 Summer Olympics.

Results

Heats
Held on July 24, 1980

Heat 1

Heat 2

Heat 3

Heat 4

Heat 5

Heat 6

Heat 7

Heat 8

Heat 9

Quarterfinals
Held on July 24, 1980

Quarterfinal 1

Quarterfinal 2

Quarterfinal 3

Quarterfinal 4

Semifinals
Held on July 25, 1980

Semifinal 1

Semifinal 2

Final
Held on July 25, 1980

See also
 100 metres at the Olympics
 1976 Men's Olympic 100 metres (Montreal)
 1978 Men's European Championships 100 metres (Prague)
 1982 Men's European Championships 100 metres (Athens)
 1983 Men's World Championships 100 metres (Helsinki)
 1984 Men's Olympic 100 metres (Los Angeles)

References

External links
IAAF.org 100m final results
Results

 1
100 metres at the Olympics
Men's events at the 1980 Summer Olympics